How Hedley Hopkins Did a Dare, robbed a grave, made a new friend who might not have really been there at all, and while he was at it committed a terrible sin which everyone was doing even though he didn't know it is a children's book written by Australian author Paul Jennings, and published by Puffin Books in May 2005. The story covers a short time in the life of young Hedley Hopkins, an English immigrant to Australia in the 1950s. The book was launched at St. Mary's Cathedral College.

An afterword of the novel states that a good deal of the story is autobiographical in nature.

References

Australian children's novels
2005 novels
Novels by Paul Jennings (Australian author)
Novels set in the 1950s
Novels set in Australia
2005 children's books